JSC RMG Copper (JSCM) (saak'ts'io sazogadoeba "RMG Copper", formerly JSC Madneuli) is a mining company based in Tbilisi, Georgia. Established in 1975,  RMG Copper is currently involved in ore, copper, and gold mining and smelting.

Ownership 

In 2005, the Russian GeoProMining purchased the state-owned Madneuli. This was one of the first public privatisations in Georgia. The company was purchased by Stanton Equity, which at that time was part of the Industrial Investors Holding. In 2007 Siman Povarenkin, who at that time was a co-owner of Industrial Investors, purchased 100% of Stanton Equity and renamed it GeoProMining.

Later in 2005 GPM purchased another Georgian asset, Quartzite (today known as RMG Gold), a producer of gold.

On June 14, 2012 Rich Metals Group acquired  100% ownership of JSC RMG Copper for US$120 Million.
 
Under the new ownership, the company previously known as JSC Madneuli changed its name to JSC RMG Copper.

JSC RMG Copper is the leading mining company in Georgia, contributing more than 10% of Georgian exports. The mine was opened in 1975 in Bolnisi region, Georgia. RMG Copper has the open pit Bolnisi Mine in the Bolnisi district of the Kvemo Kartli region in southern Georgia. The mine reached full capacity in 1978.  Western sources estimate RMG Copper's assets in this mine to be 350,435 oz (10,908 kg) of gold. Silver, copper, and other minerals are also mined at that location. This asset has been worked for 30 years.

CSR

RMG Copper invested to 1 million GEL in Corporate Social Responsibility activities in 2010.  Its projects include sport and cultural events, charity, etc. Fund Iavnana is one of the key projects

References

External links
 
 Madneuli. World Investment News.
 The Bolnisi mine is at coordinates 

Gold mining companies
Copper mining companies of Georgia (country)
Companies based in Tbilisi
Non-renewable resource companies established in 1994
1994 establishments in Georgia (country)
Mining companies of the Soviet Union